Elections to Castlereagh Borough Council were held on 18 May 1977 on the same day as the other Northern Irish local government elections. The election used three district electoral areas to elect a total of 19 councillors.

Election results

Note: "Votes" are the first preference votes.

Districts summary

|- class="unsortable" align="centre"
!rowspan=2 align="left"|Ward
! % 
!Cllrs
! % 
!Cllrs
! %
!Cllrs
! % 
!Cllrs
!rowspan=2|TotalCllrs
|- class="unsortable" align="center"
!colspan=2 bgcolor="" | Alliance
!colspan=2 bgcolor="" | UUP
!colspan=2 bgcolor="" | DUP
!colspan=2 bgcolor="white"| Others
|-
|align="left"|Area A
|bgcolor="#F6CB2F"|33.7
|bgcolor="#F6CB2F"|2
|29.7
|2
|20.5
|1
|16.1
|1
|6
|-
|align="left"|Area B
|bgcolor="#F6CB2F"|28.8
|bgcolor="#F6CB2F"|3
|18.4
|2
|16.4
|2
|36.4
|1
|8
|-
|align="left"|Area C
|bgcolor="#F6CB2F"|36.3
|bgcolor="#F6CB2F"|2
|27.6
|2
|21.5
|1
|14.6
|0
|5
|- class="unsortable" class="sortbottom" style="background:#C9C9C9"
|align="left"| Total
|32.5
|7
|24.8
|6
|18.5
|4
|24.2
|2
|19
|-
|}

Districts results

Area A

1973: 3 x UUP, 2 x Alliance, 1 x United Loyalist
1977: 2 x Alliance, 2 x UUP, 1 x DUP, 1 x Independent Unionist
1973-1977 Change: DUP and Independent Unionist gain from UUP and United Loyalist

Area B

1973: 4 x UUP, 2 x Alliance, 1 x United Loyalist, 1 x Loyalist Coalition
1977: 3 x Alliance, 2 x UUP, 2 x DUP, 1 x Independent Unionist
1973-1977 Change: DUP (two seats) and Alliance gain from UUP, United Loyalist and Loyalist Coalition

Area C

1973: 3 x UUP, 1 x Alliance, 1 x Independent
1977: 2 x Alliance, 2 x UUP, 1 x DUP
1973-1977 Change: Alliance and DUP gain from UUP and Independent

References

Castlereagh Borough Council elections
Castlereagh